Parks and Horticulture Authority (PHA) is a Lahore District government body which controls the parks and plantings in Lahore. It works with the Lahore Development Authority in many ways. It maintains all the parks and horticulture in Lahore. It was established in September 1998. It is a merged body of horticulture departments in Lahore Development Authority and Metropolitan Corporation Lahore.

See also 
 List of parks and gardens in Lahore

External links 
 PHA;s official website

Organisations based in Lahore
1998 establishments in Pakistan